IWT may refer to:
 Ifor Williams Trailers, a manufacturer of trailers up to 3500kg
 Indus Waters Treaty, a water-sharing treaty between the India and Pakistan
 Institute for the promotion of Innovation by Science and Technology, in Flanders, Belgium
 Illegal wildlife trade